Marcelina Zawadzka (born 25 January 1989) is a Polish model and beauty pageant titleholder who was crowned Miss Polonia 2011 and represented her country in Miss Universe 2012.

Miss Polonia 2011 and Miss Universe 2012
Marcelina Zawadzka has been crowned Miss Polonia 2011 by Rozalia Mancewicz (Miss Polonia 2010) on Friday night 9 December 2011 at the Center for Folklore "Matecznik - Mazowsze" in Otrebusy near Warsaw. Marcelina Zawadzka represented Poland in Miss Universe 2012 and was among the top 16, It was the highest placement for Poland since 1989.

Dancing with the Stars: Taniec z Gwiazdami
Marcelina Zawadzka participated in the 15th season of Polish Dancing with the Stars - Taniec z Gwiazdami.

Motorsport
In late 2019, Zawadzka announced that she would be making her motorsport debut in the 2020 Africa Eco Race driving in the truck category. She and co-drivers Baran Grzegorz and Sebastian Greszta finished the rally 11th in the truck class out of 13 finishers and 41st overall.

References

External links
Official Miss Polonia website

1989 births
Living people
Polish beauty pageant winners
Miss Universe 2012 contestants
Polish Roman Catholics
Miss Polonia winners